Casper Terrell Brinkley (born July 12, 1985) is a former American football defensive end for the Carolina Panthers of the National Football League. He was signed by the Panthers as an undrafted free agent in 2008, but was released by the team on September 5, 2009. He played college football at South Carolina.

College career
Brinkley played college football at the University of South Carolina. He played in 25 games producing 103 tackles and ten sacks. He majored in African-American studies.

Personal life
Brinkley's twin brother, Jasper Brinkley was drafted by the Minnesota Vikings in the 5th round of 2009.

References

External links
Carolina Panthers bio
South Carolina Gamecocks bio

Further reading

1985 births
Living people
American football defensive ends
South Carolina Gamecocks football players
Carolina Panthers players
Players of American football from Georgia (U.S. state)
People from Thomson, Georgia
Twin sportspeople